Cornwall Township may refer to the following townships

in the United States:
 Cornwall Township, Henry County, Illinois

in Canada:
 Cornwall Township, Ontario, former name of South Stormont, township in Ontario

See also 
 North Cornwall Township, Lebanon County, Pennsylvania
 West Cornwall Township, Lebanon County, Pennsylvania
 Cornwall County (disambiguation)
 Cornwall (disambiguation)